Teekoa Iuta was the first Kiribati ambassador to Taiwan (31 May 2013 – 2018).  At the same time, she was ambassador to Japan.  Iuta had been a cabinet secretary-general of Kiribati before becoming Ambassador. She was replaced as ambassador by Tessie Eria Lambourne.

References

Women ambassadors
Ambassadors of Kiribati to Taiwan
Ambassadors of Kiribati to Japan
Year of birth missing (living people)
Living people